Conus fragilissimus, common name the fragile geography cone, is a species of sea snail, a marine gastropod mollusk in the family Conidae, the cone snails and their allies.

Like all species within the genus Conus, these snails are predatory and venomous. They are capable of "stinging" humans, therefore live ones should be handled carefully or not at all.

Description
Original description: "Shell extremely thin, fragile, translucent, glossy; outline ovately cylindrical; sides convex, tapering to the anterior end; shoulder wide, angled, with prominent coronations; spire high, stepped, somewhat scalariform; spire sculpture consisting of 4-6 fine revolving spiral threads; aperture wide, flaring; color pale tan with longitudinal brown flammules, flammules often coalescing into large brown patches; base color pattern overlaid with variable amounts of dots, dashes, and netlike pattern; spire color pale tan with regularly spaced dark brown flammules; protoconch and early whorls dark brown; shoulder coronations white; aperture white; periostracum smooth, translucent yellow; operculum unknown."

The size of the shell varies between 26 mm and 50 mm.

Distribution
Locus typicus: "3 metres depth, off South coast of Harmil Isl., 
Dahlak Archipelago, Eritrea Province, Ethiopia."

This species occurs in the Red Sea and off Ethiopia.

Etymology
"In reference to the almost paper thinness of the shell."

References

 Tucker J.K. & Tenorio M.J. (2009) Systematic classification of Recent and fossil conoidean gastropods. Hackenheim: Conchbooks. 296 pp.
 Puillandre N., Duda T.F., Meyer C., Olivera B.M. & Bouchet P. (2015). One, four or 100 genera? A new classification of the cone snails. Journal of Molluscan Studies. 81: 1–23

External links
 The Conus Biodiversity website
 Cone Shells – Knights of the Sea
 

fragilissimus
Gastropods described in 1979